Zel may refer to:

 Zel (novel), a retelling of Rapunzel by Donna Jo Napoli
 Zel (sheep), a breed of sheep
 Bella Bella (Campbell Island) Airport (IATA:ZEL), British Columbia, Canada
 Zero-length launch
 The twelfth letter in the Ottoman Turkish alphabet

People
 Mr. Zel (born 1985), Turkish Cypriot singer
 Zel Fischer (born 1963), judge on the Supreme Court of Missouri
 Denzel Curry, South Florida hip-hop artist

See also 
 Zell (disambiguation)
 Zelle (disambiguation)